Ashok Kumar is an Indian politician from Samastipur ( Bihar) and of the 'वारिसनगर' Bihar Legislative Assembly. He was elected from Warisnagar constituency in the 2015 Bihar Legislative Assembly election as a candidate from Janata Dal (United) of the Mahagathbandhan (Bihar). He is from Katghara village. He is commonly known as Munna Mandal by the villagers.

References 

Living people
Year of birth missing (living people)
Bihar MLAs 2015–2020
Bihar MLAs 2020–2025
Janata Dal (United) politicians
Date of birth missing (living people)